Electric Apricot: Quest For Festeroo is a mockumentary film by Primus lead-man Les Claypool, featuring himself as well as others using pseudonyms. The band Electric Apricot played occasional shows in 2004 and 2005, unannounced, in the California area for footage. The Electric Apricot also made an appearance at the SXSW music festival in Austin, TX in 2007. The movie has been screened at film festivals internationally, including the Bonnaroo Music Festival and The Raindance Festival in London.

The movie tells the story of a UCLA filmmaker making a music documentary. Claypool himself plays the role of drummer-singer Lapland "Lapdog" Miclovik of rising jam-band Electric Apricot, heading to the holy grail of festivals, Festeroo.

Besides the leads, notable names in the cast include Bob Weir, Mike Gordon, Warren Haynes, Seth Green, Matt Stone, Wavy Gravy, Dian Bachar, Arj Barker, Gabby La La, Sirena Irwin and Sam Maccarone.

The soundtrack album was released on March 18, 2008, while the DVD was released May 13, 2008.

Poster art and packaging designed by Zoltron and Dave Hunter.

Crew
 Director - Les Claypool
 Executive Producer - Matthew J. Powers
 Producer - Jason McHugh
 Associate Producer - Anthony Mindel
 Director of Photography - Matthew J. Powers
 Editor - Agent Ogden

Cast 
 Adam Gates as Steve Hampton Trouzdale, a.k.a. Aiwass (bass guitar/vocals)
 Bryan Kehoe as Steven Allan Gordon a.k.a. Gordo (lead guitar/vocals)
 Les Claypool as Lapland Miclovich a.k.a. Lapdog (drums/vocals)
 Jonathan Korty as Herschel Tambor Brillstien (keyboards/vocals)
 Jason McHugh as "Smilin'" Don Kleinfeld
 Kyle McCulloch as Drew Shackleford
 Dian Bachar as Skip Holmes
 Brian Kite as Dr. Brian "Bucky" Lefkowitz
 Oz Fritz as Oswald George
 Arj Barker as the Cube
 Derek Walls as Duck the band technician
 Jason Thompson as Jake the band technician
 Seth Green and Matt Stone as the Taper Guys
 Sirena Irwin as a photographer
 Gabby La La as Mai Pang
 Sam Maccarone as a bartender
 Matthew J. Powers as Davis Mindelhof
 Fred Heim as a police officer
 Chaney, Cage, and Lena Claypool as the coffee shop family
 Slawek Michalak as the Hydroponics salesman
 Betty Biodiesel as Festeroo MC
 Lawrence Brooke as the narrator
 Bob Weir as himself
 Mike Gordon as himself
 Warren Haynes as himself
 Wavy Gravy
 Dian Bachar
 Arj Barker

References

External links
 
 
 Home page
 Electric Apricot News Site
 Trailer (for the DVD)
 
 
 Electric Apricot Blog Posting on Twan's List

American mockumentary films